Phasma is an Australasian genus of stick insects in the family Phasmatidae, subfamily Phasmatinae and tribe Phasmatini.

Species
The Catalogue of Life lists:
 Phasma gigas (Linnaeus, 1758) - type species (as Phasma empusa Lichtenstein)
 Phasma marosense Hennemann, 1998
 Phasma reinwardtii Haan, 1842

Additional images

References

External links
 

Phasmatodea genera
Phasmatodea of Asia